Lake George or George Lake may refer to:

Inhabited places

Australia

 Lake George, New South Wales, a locality in the Queanbeyan–Palerang Regional Council and Yass Valley Council

Canada

Lake George, Kings County, Nova Scotia
Lake George, Yarmouth County, Nova Scotia
Lake George, New Brunswick

United States
Lake George, Colorado, a town in Park County, Colorado
Lake George, Michigan, an unincorporated community
Lake George Township, Hubbard County, Minnesota
 Lake George, Minnesota, an unincorporated community and census-designated place in Lake George Township, Hubbard County
Lake George Township, Stearns County, Minnesota
Lake George (town), New York, a town in Warren County, New York
Lake George (village), New York, a village in the town of Lake George in Warren County, New York

Lakes

Australia
Lake George (New South Wales), a shallow lake in south-eastern New South Wales
Lake George (South Australia), a  hypersaline lake with an outlet to the sea

Canada
Lake George (New Brunswick), a lake near Fredericton, New Brunswick
Lake George (Kings County, Nova Scotia), a lake in Kings County, Nova Scotia
George Lake (Nunavut), the location of George Lake Aerodrome, Nunavut
Lake George (Michigan–Ontario), a small lake near Sault Ste. Marie, between Sugar Island and mainland Ontario

Uganda
Lake George (Uganda), a major lake that is part of the African Great Lakes system

United States
Lake George (Alaska), a United States National Natural Landmark
Lake George (Arkansas), a lake in Conway County, Arkansas
Lake George (Colorado), a lake in Colorado
Lake George (Florida), on the St. Johns River in Volusia County, Florida
Lake George (Indiana) (disambiguation), several lakes in northern Indiana
Lake George (Anoka County, Minnesota), a lake in Anoka County, Minnesota
Lake George (Cass County, Minnesota)
Lake George (Hubbard County, Minnesota)
George Lake (Missoula County, Montana), a lake in Missoula County, Montana
George Lake (Park County, Montana), a lake in Park County, Montana
Lake George (lake), New York, a major lake in northern New York State, draining into Lake Champlain, and then into the St. Lawrence River, Canada

See also
George Hingston Lake (1847–1900), politician in the early days of colonial South Australia
George Lake (footballer) (1889–1918), English footballer
George Lake Aerodrome, a privately owned ice runway located on George Lake, Nunavut, Canada
St. George Lake, a lake in Waldo County, Maine